Al-Malikiyah also known as Derik, is a small Syrian city and the center of an administrative district belonging to Al-Hasakah Governorate. The district constitutes the northeastern corner of the country, and is where the Syrian Democratic Council convenes. According to the Syria Central Bureau of Statistics (CBS), Al-Malikiyah had a population about 26,311 residents in the 2004 census. It is the administrative center of a nahiyah ("subdistrict") consisting of 108 localities with a combined population of 125,000. The population enjoys demographic and ethnic diversity that is characteristic of most of Al-Hasakah Governorate. The town is inhabited by Kurds, Assyrians, Arabs and Armenians.

Etymology
There are two theories on the local Syriac and Kurdish name of the city. The first theory is that the city is named after an ancient monastery ('dayr' in Syriac) located in its vicinity, while the second one argues that the name "Dêrik" stems from the Kurdish word du rek meaning 'two roads'. In 1957, the town was named "Al-Malikiyah", after a Syrian army officer Adnan al-Malki. In 1977, a decree was issued to ban all non-Arabic place names. Therefore the Kurdish and Syriac-Aramaic names were banned from being used.

History
The city is located in the middle of Hesinyan plain between the Tigris and Safan rivers. The region was controlled by the Kurdish Botan principality until 1848 and inhabited mostly by the Kurdish Hesinyan tribe, gaving the plain its name. Before attaining the size of a city, Derik village was given by the prince Bedirkhan Botani to Hemko Hesinî, who was a military leader for Botan principality in its last years, hence the city has its alternative name: Dêrka Hemko.
After World War I, the French enlisted help from the Kurdish Milli tribe to control the whole region east of Euphrates river up to the Tigris. The French chose the village of Ayn Dywar as the center for the region, but in 1927 they moved the administrative center to Derik. And since then the village developed into a city .

, Al-Malikiyah is the fifth largest city in Al-Hasakah governorate.

Civil War
As a result of the ongoing civil war, Al-Malikiyah is currently controlled by the AANES. On 21 July 2012, YPG forces reportedly captured Al-Malikiyah, which is located just 10 kilometers from the Turkish border, although another report stated that fighting was still going on in the city. On 22 July, it was reported that Kurdish forces were still fighting for Al-Malikiyah, and one young Kurdish activist was killed after government security forces allegedly opened fire on protesters. In November 2012, Syrian government forces withdrew from the city.

Kurdish-led authorities subsequently installed the "Dêrik prison" for captured Islamic State members in al-Malikiyah. In April 2019, the prison was the site of a major prison escape attempt by about 200 ISIL detainees, including several French jihadists. The breakout was foiled, however, and some prisoners were distributed to other detention centers.

In May 2020, reports emerged that Russia had begun building a new military base in Qeser Dib, a village outside of al-Malikiyah.
In 2021, the United States Army constructed a Forward Operations Base 3.8 kilometers south of the city. The base is operated by United States Special Forces and a Combat Action Team who patrol in Bradley Fighting Vehicles

On 2 February 2022, four civilians were killed after an armed Turkish drone bombed a power station near the city.

Demographics

In 2004, the population of Al-Malikiyah was 26,311. The population consists mostly of ethnic Kurds and Assyrians in addition to a significant, large number of Arabs and a smaller number of Armenians. The northern half of the town is mainly inhabited by Muslim Kurds, and the southern part by Assyrians and Armenians. As the economic center of the district, the town is usually filled with people from the surrounding villages and towns, especially during the morning hours. Al-Malikiyah has seen a dramatic urban expansion and real estate development in recent years which led to many streets being extended to new neighborhoods that are now part of the continually growing town.

As of November 2014, only 200 ethnic Armenians remain in the city out of a pre-civil war figure of 450.

Churches in the city
 Syriac Orthodox Church of Our Lady (كنيسة السيدة العذراء للسريان الأرثوذكس)
 Syriac Orthodox Church of Saint Shmouni (كنيسة القديسة مارت شموني للسريان الارثوذكس)
 Syriac Orthodox Church of Saint Dodo (كنيسة القديس مار دودو للسريان الارثوذكس)
 Syriac Orthodox Mazar (mausoleum) of Saint Jacob of Nisibis (مزار القديس مار يعقوب النصيبيني للسريان الارثوذكس)
 Chaldean Catholic Church of Saint George (كنيسة مار جرجس للكلدان الكاثوليك)
 Armenian Orthodox Church of Our Lady (كنيسة السيدة العــذراء للأرمن الأرثوذكس)
 National Evangelical Presbyterian Church (الكنيسة الإنجيلية المشيخية الوطنية)
 Jesus The Light of the World National Evangelical Church (كنيسة الاتحاد المسيحي يسوع نور العالم)

Notable people 
Jarjis Danho
Hevrin Khalaf
Faia Younan
Sherwan Haji

Gallery

See also
Syrian civil war

References

Cities in Syria
Populated places in al-Malikiyah District
Al-Malikiyah District
Assyrian communities in Syria
Kurdish communities in Syria